The 1983–84 season of the European Cup Winners' Cup was won by Juventus in a final against Porto. The next year, the club went on to complete a full complement of European trophies with the European Cup. Aberdeen were the defending champions, but were eliminated in the semi-finals by Porto.

Universitatea Craiova, winners of the 1983 Romanian Cup Final, had their entry rejected since the Romanian Football Federation scheduled the Cup Final for one week after the closing date for entries. As a result, Andrei Rădulescu and Florin Dumitrescu, the president and secretary of the Federation, were sacked.

Preliminary round

|}

First leg

Second leg

Magdeburg won 2–1 on aggregate.

First round

|}

First leg

Second leg

3–3 on aggregate; Manchester United won on away goals.

Servette won 9–1 on aggregate.

NEC won 2–1 on aggregate.

Barcelona won 7–1 on aggregate.

Spartak Varna won 1–0 on aggregate.

Hammarby won 5–2 on aggregate.

Haka won 4–0 on aggregate.

Paris Saint-Germain won 4–2 on aggregate.

Juventus won 10–2 on aggregate.

Rangers won 18–0 on aggregate.

2–2 on aggregate; Porto won on away goals.

Shakhtar Donetsk won 9–3 on aggregate.

Újpest won 4–3 on aggregate.

Köln won 7–2 on aggregate.

Beveren won 7–3 on aggregate.

Aberdeen won 2–1 on aggregate.

Second round

|}

First leg

Second leg

Shakhtar Donetsk won 3–1 on aggregate.

Barcelona won 5–2 on aggregate.

Manchester United won 4–1 on aggregate.

Haka won 3–2 on aggregate.

2–2 on aggregate; Juventus won on away goals. 

2–2 on aggregate; Porto won on away goals.

5–5 on aggregate; Újpest won on away goals.

Aberdeen won 4–1 on aggregate.

Quarter-finals

|}

First leg

Second leg

Manchester United won 3–2 on aggregate.

Juventus won 2–0 on aggregate.

Porto won 4–3 on aggregate.

Aberdeen won 3–2 on aggregate.

Semi-finals

|}

First leg

Second leg

Juventus won 3–2 on aggregate.

Porto won 2–0 on aggregate.

Final

Top scorers

See also
1983–84 European Cup
1983–84 UEFA Cup

References

External links
 1983-84 competition at UEFA website
 Cup Winners' Cup results at Rec.Sport.Soccer Statistics Foundation
 Cup Winners Cup Seasons 1983-84–results, protocols
 website Football Archive 1983–84 Cup Winners Cup

3
UEFA Cup Winners' Cup seasons